Floreo de Reata or Trick roping is a Mexican entertainment or competitive art involving the spinning of a lasso, also known as a lariat or a rope.  Besides Mexico and Mexican Charreria, it is also associated with Wild West shows or Western arts in the United States.

The lasso is a well-known tool of Mexican Vaqueros, who developed rope spinning and throwing skills in using lassos to catch animals. Mexican Vaqueros developed various tricks to show off their prowess with the lasso and demonstrations of these tricks evolved into entertainment and competitive disciplines.

Trick Roping was introduced to the United States by Mexican Charro Vicente Oropeza while working for Buffalo Bill’s Wild West Show in the 1890’s and was declared “Champion of the World” in 1900.  
The well-established repertoire of tricks can be divided into three fundamental categories: "flat loop", "vertical loop", and "butterfly". In addition, thrown-loop tricks and tricks that involve the use of two ropes are used. Among the vertical loop tricks is the "Texas Skip", which involves the performer spinning the lasso in a wide loop in a vertical plane and jumping through the loop from one side to the other on each rotation.

Well-known trick ropers include:
Vicente Oropeza was the Mexican Charro that introduced the Mexican art of Trick Roping to the United States. He was posthumously inducted into the National Cowboy and Western Heritage Museum Hall of Fame.
Texas Jack Omohundro was the first performer to introduce roping acts to the American stage.
Texas Rose Bascom was of Cherokee Choctaw ancestry billed as the "Queen of the Trick Ropers," appeared in Hollywood movies, toured the world with the Bob Hope Troupe, Roy Rogers and Dale Evans, and Montie Montana, inducted into the National Cowgirl Hall of Fame.
Montie Montana had a 60-year career as a trick roper, and appeared in several John Wayne movies.
Actor and humorist Will Rogers, known for his roles as a cowboy, was an expert at trick roping. Rogers' rope tricks were showcased in the 1922 silent film The Ropin' Fool. He credited Mexican Charro Vicente Oropeza for inspiring him to become a trick roper, and called Oropeza the greatest trick roper ever.  
Vince Bruce (b. April 4, 1955, d. September 24, 2011) was internationally acclaimed as one of the best Western acts in the world; Bruce made his Broadway debut in 1991, in the Tony Award-winning musical The Will Rogers Follies — A Life in Revue. Appearing as the trick-roping star and portraying Rogers in this tribute to the cowboy and vaudeville star, Bruce remained with the show for two and a half years at New York’s Palace Theatre. For his act, he performed a spin with two ropes, a feat first devised 60 years earlier by Will Rogers himself. On July 21, 1991, at the Empire State Building, Vince set a new world record — 4,011 — for “Texas Skips”.
Flores LaDue (1883-1951) was the only cowgirl to claim three world championships for trick and fancy roping; Flores remained undefeated in the event. Flores and her husband, Guy Weadick, also a trick roper, organized and produced the first Calgary Stampede. Flores Ladue is reputed to have been the first trick roper to perform the Texas Skip.
Horse trainer Buck Brannaman began his career in a child trick roping act with his brother.
The English troupe known as El Granadas, who performed at the 1946 Royal Variety Performance.

See also
 Bullwhip
 Wild West shows
 Montie Montana

References

External links
 The Lasso: A Rational Guide to Trick Roping by Carey Bunks, a book on trick roping that is available online under a GPL-type licence.

 
American frontier
Circus skills
Performing arts
Object manipulation
Rodeo-affiliated events